Nikola Vučurović (born May 17, 1980) is a Montenegrin professional basketball player for Teodo Tivat of the Montenegrin League.

External links
 Profile at fiba.com
 Profile at eurobasket.com
 Profile at draftexpress.com

1980 births
Living people
ABA League players
Basketball League of Serbia players
KB Prishtina players
KK Ergonom players
KK Crvena zvezda players
KK Igokea players
KK Lovćen players
KK MZT Skopje players
KK Sutjeska players
KK Teodo Tivat players
KK Vojvodina players
Köln 99ers players
Montenegrin expatriate basketball people in Serbia
Montenegrin expatriate basketball people in Germany
Montenegrin men's basketball players
Small forwards